Calodecaryia is a genus of flowering plants belonging to the family Meliaceae.

Its native range is Madagascar.

Species:

Calodecaryia crassifolia 
Calodecaryia pauciflora

References

Meliaceae
Meliaceae genera